Adlard is an English surname, most common in Norfolk and Lincolnshire, and derived from the given name Adelard as is the more common name Allard. 

Notable people with the surname include:

 Charlie Adlard (born 1966), English comics artist
 Mark Adlard (born 1932), English science fiction writer
 Robert Adlard (born 1915), British field hockey player
 Steve Adlard, British footballer

References 

English-language surnames